This is an alphabetically sorted list of Asian countries, with their factual and estimated gross domestic product data by the International Monetary Fund.

References

GDP 
Asia
GDP